is a private university in Kashiwa, Chiba Prefecture, Japan. Below it is referred to as just Reitaku. The predecessor of Reitaku University was Moralogy School, launched in 1935, and Reitaku University itself was established in 1959.

Department
Faculty of Foreign Studies
English and Communication Studies
English Language and Cultures
International Exchange and Cooperation
German Language and Culture
Chinese Language
Japanese and International Communication

Faculty of Economics and Business Administration
Department of Economics
Department of Business Administration
Department of Specialized Courses
International Management and Communication(English)
Chinese Management and Communication(Chinese)
REPPL Civil Servant
REPPL Tax Accountant

Japanese Language Program
Japanese Language Course

International Student Program
All departments offer programs for studying abroad, collaborating with more than 30 universities in other countries. Foreign students come to Reitaku from the United States, China, Taiwan, South Korea, Vietnam, Bhutan, Germany, Finland and other countries.

Reitaku has many foreign professors, so its official languages are Japanese and English.

Reitaku gives scholarships ranging from US$1,000 to US$10,000 to students who go to study abroad.

Research
Reitaku University has a Business Ethics and Compliance Center, which researches the legal and ethical environments of businesses.

External links
 Reitaku University (English)
 Reitaku University (Japanese)
 Reitaku High School (English)
 Reitaku High School (Japanese)
 Reitaku International Course (English)
 Reitaku International Course (Japanese)
 R-bec (Japanese)

Educational institutions established in 1935
Private universities and colleges in Japan
Reitaku University
Kashiwa
1935 establishments in Japan